Chehel Hesar (also Romanized as Chehel Ḩeşār) is a village in Rezqabad Rural District, in the Central District of Esfarayen County, North Khorasan Province, Iran. At the 2006 census, its population was 1,396, in 321 families.

References 

Populated places in Esfarayen County